South Meadow Brook Reservoir, also known as South Meadow Brook Pond, is a  pond in Carver, Massachusetts. South Meadow Brook flows through the pond. The pond is located north of Edaville Railroad.

External links
Environmental Protection Agency

Ponds of Plymouth County, Massachusetts
Ponds of Massachusetts